The American Printing House for the Blind (APH) is an American non-for-profit corporation in Louisville, Kentucky, promoting independent living for people who are blind and visually impaired. For over 150 years APH has created unique products and services to support all aspects of daily life without sight.

History 
The first United States schools for blind children opened in the 1830s. There were very few books and educational materials for the students. Teachers made their own tactile teaching aids and acquired embossed books from Europe. The American Printing House for the Blind (APH) was established in 1858 in response to the growing need for books and educational aids for blind students.

Dempsey Sherrod, a blind man from Mississippi, promoted the idea of a central printing house for books for blind people. He raised funds for the enterprise, which he named the American Printing House for the Blind. In 1857, Sherrod obtained a charter in Mississippi to establish a publishing house to print books in raised letters, and because of its central location, named Louisville as the proposed location. In 1858, the General Assembly of Kentucky passed An Act To Establish The American Printing House For The Blind.

Two years later, in 1860, APH received its first operating funds from private citizens in Mississippi and Kentucky. A press was purchased and APH was set up in the basement of the Kentucky School for the Blind.

Legislatures in Mississippi, Louisiana, and Tennessee had appropriated funds for APH, and private donations had been collected in these states, but before the institution could begin its work of embossing books, the Civil War broke out. This wiped out any possibility of the southern states making good on their promises of funding. It was not until 1865 that a state allocation from Kentucky, along with donations from individuals in Ohio, Indiana, Kentucky, and Illinois, allowed APH to begin the work for which it was founded.

The first book produced by APH was Fables and Tales for Children. It was embossed in 1866 in a raised Roman letter type called Boston line letter. It would be many years before Braille was the standard reading system for blind people.

Federal funding 
Because printing books in raised letters could never be commercially successful, federal support was sought to assure a permanent printing fund. A bill was drawn up and presented to the 45th Congress. An Act to Promote the Education of the Blind became a law on March 3, 1879. The American Printing House for the Blind was designated as the official source of educational texts and aids for legally blind students throughout the country—a mandate that continues to the present.

Federal funding created new demands for embossed books and the Printing House soon outgrew its rooms at the Kentucky School for the Blind. APH Trustees purchased land adjacent to the school where, in 1883, a building was erected to house the growing operations of APH. The current APH facility is still located on the same site and occupies nearly a city block. APH employs over 300 people.

In the remaining years of the 19th century, the APH production of embossed books increased dramatically, growing from a 15-page publications catalog in 1894 to a 100-page listing ten years later. The first books had been produced in several different kinds of embossed codes and alphabets. Gradually, these systems were phased out in favor of braille. APH printed its first braille books—several readers and children's books—in 1893.

Improvements were continually sought for a better stereograph, a faster press—anything that would lower the cost of embossed book production. Catalog offerings were basic braille slates, writing guides, maps, spelling frames, etc.

In the twentieth century APH continued its efforts to provide accessible materials to help blind people become independent. Publication of the braille edition of Reader's Digest in 1928 provided blind readers with the first popular magazine available in braille. The magazine is currently sent to over 1,200 blind readers nationwide.

Talking Books 
In 1936, the APH recording studio and record production department were established and production of Talking Books began. The first recorded weekly magazine, the Talking Book edition of Newsweek, was introduced in 1959 and the first recorded encyclopedia, the Talking World Book, in 1981. Flexible records were first produced in 1970 and cassette tapes in 1973. Today, APH produces over two million cassette tapes annually.

In addition to braille, large type (1948), and recorded books, APH produced educational aids. To facilitate development of these products, an educational research department was established in 1953. Notable products were the New Hall Braille Writer (1940), the Lavender Braille Writer (1962) and the Cranmer Abacus (1963). In 1960, APH completed the largest braille project ever undertaken, the 145-volume braille edition of the World Book Encyclopedia.

Campus 
To house the growing production, the building was expanded many times. A new administration building, built in front of the 1883 façade, opened in 1955. In 1980, an addition to the manufacturing area brought the building to its present size (282,000 sq. ft.).

Efforts to improve braille production resulted in the first computerized braille translation in 1964. IBM, the company that led in developing the program, donated a $2 million 709 computer. By 1987, all but a fraction of braille production was completely computerized.

A computerized database for accessible textbooks was introduced in 1988 and was expanded to include materials in all accessible media. In 1997, the database was named Louis and made available on the Internet.

References

External links

Museum of the American Printing House for the Blind

Blindness organizations in the United States
Organizations based in Louisville, Kentucky
Organizations established in 1860
1860 establishments in Kentucky